Rosane Favilla (born July 16, 1964) is a Brazilian rhythmic gymnast.

Favilla competed for Brazil in the rhythmic gymnastics individual all-around competition at the 1984 Summer Olympics in Los Angeles. There she tied for 24th place in the preliminary (qualification) round and did not advance to the final.

See also
List of Olympic rhythmic gymnasts for Brazil

References

External links 
 Rosana Favila at Sports-Reference.com

1964 births
Living people
Brazilian rhythmic gymnasts
Gymnasts at the 1984 Summer Olympics
Olympic gymnasts of Brazil